Montagrier is a commune in the Dordogne department in Nouvelle-Aquitaine in southwestern France.

Population

Sights
The Romanesque church was formerly a priory church.  It contains a tenth-century inscription on a plaque, and the precincts now form a pleasant small park.  Little remains of the walls which once surrounded the village. Unusually, for such a small place, Montagrier also has two chapels. Services are still held at Saint Sicaire, on the opposite end of the village from the church. There is also a tiny former chapel next to the auberge which is now used as an information centre. It is opposite the site of the castle (of which only the ruins of the stables remain). The chapel may have served the castle in the Middle Ages. During the Hundred Years War, the castle was in the possession of the Montagus, then resident in England.

See also
Communes of the Dordogne department

References

Communes of Dordogne